The Ministry of Education and Research is a government ministry in Sweden responsible for matters relating to schools, universities, colleges, and research.

Before 1968, the ministry was called the Ministry of Education and Ecclesiastical Affairs.

The ministry offices are located at Drottninggatan 16 in central Stockholm.

Organization 
The Ministry of Education and Research has a staff of 200. The head of the ministry is the Minister for Education, currently Mats Persson (L).

Areas of responsibility 
 Education and research

Government agencies 
The Ministry of Education and Research is principal to the following government agencies:

Ministers for Higher Education and Research

References

External links 
 Ministry of Education and Research, official website 
 Utbildningsdepartementet, official website 

Education and Research
Culture ministries
Sweden
Research ministries
Sweden, Education and Research